"Luv Parade/Color of Life" is the fifteenth single by Japanese recording artist Misia. It was released on July 5, 2006 as the first single from Misia's seventh studio album Ascension.

Background 

"Luv Parade/Color of Life" is Misia's first single release in two years. It is Misia's second double A-side single, the first since "In My Soul/Snow Song from Mars & Roses." The single package features double covers: a "Luv Parade" edit and a "Color of Life" edit. The first pressing of "Luv Parade/Color of Life" comes housed in a cardboard sleeve.

"Luv Parade" was written by Misia and composed and produced by American producer Vinny Vero and Swedish producer Marco Nicosia. It was used in commercials for three different online music stores, Music.jp, Iromelomix DX by Dwango, and Mu-Mo by Avex, and became the first song to advertise all three companies. "Color of Life" was written by Misia, co-composed by Misia and Joi, and produced by Joi. The song was used in commercials for the Toyota WISH, starring football player Hidetoshi Nakata.

The B-side, "Taiyō ga Kureta Present," was also written by Misia, co-composed by Misia and Mits Ishibashi, and produced by Ishibashi. The song was used in commercials for Live One by Sumitomo Life, starring actress Nanako Matsushima. The single also includes a Joe Claussell remix of the digital single "Shinin' (Nijiiro no Rhythm)."

Chart performance 
"Luv Parade/Color of Life" debuted on the Oricon Daily Singles chart at number 11 and peaked at number 16 on the Oricon Weekly Singles chart, with 13,632 copies sold in its first week. The single charted for eight weeks and sold a total of 24,410 copies.

Track listing

Charts

Release history

References

External links 

2006 singles
Misia songs
Songs written by Misia